"Ain't I a Woman?" is a speech, delivered extemporaneously, by Sojourner Truth (1797–1883), born into slavery in New York State. Some time after gaining her freedom in 1827, she became a well known anti-slavery speaker. Her speech was delivered at the Women's Convention in Akron, Ohio, in 1851, and did not originally have a title.

The speech was briefly reported in two contemporary newspapers, and a transcript of the speech was published in the Anti-Slavery Bugle on June 21, 1851. It received wider publicity in 1863 during the American Civil War when Frances Dana Barker Gage published a different version, one which became known as Ain't I a Woman,? because of its oft-repeated question. This later, better known and more widely available version was the one commonly referenced in popular culture and, until historian Nell Irvin Painter's 1996 biography of Truth, by historians as well. 

Sojourner Truth was born Isabella Baumfree, in 1797 in Ulster County, New York. Truth ran from her master in 1827 after he went back on his promise of her freedom. She became a priest and an activist throughout the 1840s-1850s. She delivered her speech, "Ain't I a Woman?", at the Women's Rights Convention in 1851. Truth questions the treatment of white women compared to Black women.  Seemingly pointing out a man in the room, Truth says, "That man over there says that women need to be helped into carriages, and lifted over ditches, and to have the best place everywhere." In the Gage version, she exclaims that no one ever does any of these things for her, repeating the question, "And ain't I a woman?" several times. She says that she has worked and birthed many children, making her as much a woman as anyone else. Despite giving birth to children just like white women did, black women were not treated with the same respect as white women. Black women were women, but because their race was seen as inferior, being a women did not mean much if they were not white. There is no official published version of her speech; many rewritings of it were published anywhere from one month to 12 years after it was spoken.

Background

The phrase "Am I not a man and a brother?" had been used by British abolitionists since the late 18th century to decry the inhumanity of slavery. This male motto was first turned female in the 1820s by British abolitionists, then in 1830 the American abolitionist newspaper Genius of Universal Emancipation carried an image of a slave woman asking "Am I not a woman and a sister?" This image was widely republished in the 1830s, and struck into a copper coin or token, but without the question mark, to give the question a positive answer. In 1833, African American activist Maria W. Stewart used the words of this motto to argue for the rights of women of every race.

Different versions
The first reports of the speech were published by the New York Tribune on June 6, 1851, and by The Liberator five days later. Both of these accounts were brief, lacking a full transcription. The first complete transcription, titled "On Woman's Rights", was published on June 21 in the Anti-Slavery Bugle by Marius Robinson, an abolitionist and newspaper editor who acted as the convention's recording secretary. Robinson was in the audience during Truth's original speech. The question "Ain't I a Woman?" does not appear in his account.

Twelve years later, in May 1863, Frances Dana Barker Gage published a very different transcription. In it, she gave Truth many of the speech characteristics of Southern slaves, and she included new material that Robinson had not reported. Gage's version of the speech was republished in 1875, 1881, and 1889, and became the historic standard. This version is known as "Ain't I a Woman?" after its oft-repeated refrain. Truth's style of speech was not like that of Southern slaves; she was born and raised in New York, and spoke only Dutch until she was nine years old.

Additions that Gage made to Truth's speech include the ideas that she could bear the lash as well as a man, that no one ever offered her the traditional gentlemanly deference due a woman, and that most of her 13 children were sold away from her into slavery. Truth is widely believed to have had five children, with one sold away, and was never known to claim more children. Further inaccuracies in Gage's 1863 account conflict with her own contemporary report: Gage wrote in 1851 that Akron in general and the press in particular were largely friendly to the woman's rights convention, but in 1863 she wrote that the convention leaders were fearful of the "mobbish" opponents. Other eyewitness reports of Truth's speech told a different story, one where all faces were "beaming with joyous gladness" at the session where Truth spoke; that not "one discordant note" interrupted the harmony of the proceedings. In contrast to Gage's later version, Truth was warmly received by the convention-goers, the majority of whom were long-standing abolitionists, friendly to progressive ideas of race and civil rights.

In 1972, Miriam Schneir published a version of Truth's speech in her anthology Feminism: The Essential Historical Writings. This is a reprint of Gage's version without the heavy dialect or her interjected comments. In her introduction to the work, she includes that the speech has survived because it was written by Gage.

The version known as "Ain't I a Woman" remained the most widely circulated version until the work of historian Nell Irvin Painter, followed up by the Sojourner Truth Project, found strong historical evidence that the Gage speech was likely very inaccurate, and the Robinson speech was the likely the most accurate version.

The speech

1851 version by Robinson

Truth delivered the speech on May 29, 1851 at the Woman’s Rights Convention in Akron, Ohio. Marcus Robinson, who attended the convention and worked with Truth, printed the speech as he transcribed it in the June 21, 1851, issue of the Anti-Slavery Bugle.

1863 version by Gage
The speech was recalled 12 years after the fact by Gage, an activist in the woman's rights and abolition movements. Gage, who presided at the meeting, described the event:

The following is the speech as Gage recalled it in History of Woman Suffrage which was, according to her, in the original dialect as it was presented by Sojourner Truth:

Gage described the result: 
Amid roars of applause, she returned to her corner, leaving more than one of us with streaming eyes, and hearts beating with gratitude. She had taken us up in her strong arms and carried us safely over the slough of difficulty turning the whole tide in our favor. I have never in my life seen anything like the magical influence that subdued the mobbish spirit of the day, and turned the sneers and jeers of an excited crowd into notes of respect and admiration. Hundreds rushed up to shake hands with her, and congratulate the glorious old mother, and bid her God-speed on her mission of 'testifyin' agin concerning the wickedness of this 'ere people.'

The speeches have been recorded in renditions close to Truth's authentic Dutch voice, and can be heard at The Sojourner Truth Project.

Legacy
There is no single, undisputed official version of Truth's speech. Robinson and Truth were friends who had worked together concerning both abolition of slavery and women's rights, and his report is strictly his recollection with no added commentary. Since Robinson's version was published in the Anti-Slavery Bugle, the audience is largely concerned with the rights of African Americans rather than women; it is possible Robinson's version is framed for his audience, which would be largely men. Although Truth collaborated with Robinson on the transcription of her speech, Truth did not dictate his writing word for word.
 
The most widely circulated version of the speech was written by Gage years after the fact, but there are no reports of Gage working with Truth on the transcription. Gage portrays Truth as using a Southern dialect, which the earliest reports of the speech do not mention. Truth is said to have prided herself on her spoken English, and she was born and raised in New York state, speaking only Jersey Dutch until the age of 9. The dialect in Gage's 1863 version is less severe than in her later version of the speech that she published in 1881. In addition, the crowd Truth addressed that day consisted of mainly white, privileged women. Despite many claims that Truth was welcomed with respect, Gage recalls that the crowd did not want Truth to speak because they did not want people to mix the cause of suffrage with abolition. Because they were not fighting for the same cause, white women who supported the suffrage movement did not want it to be linked to the abolitionist struggle. White people at the time did not support African Americans, who were the focus of the abolition movement. Although Gage's version provides further context, it is written as a narrative: she adds her own commentary, creating an entire scene of the event, including the audience reactions. Because Gage's version is built primarily on her interpretation and the way she chose to portray it, it cannot be considered a pure representation of the event.

References

Further reading 
  Pdf.
 Jones, Martha S. (Fall 2020). Vanguard: How Black Women Broke Barriers, Won the Vote, and Insisted on Equality for All. BasicBooks.
 Pdf.
 Painter, Nell Irvin (Fall 1997). Sojourner Truth: A Life, A Symbol. W.W. Norton.
 Pdf.
  Pdf.

External links
 Version of Gage, 1878 in google books, without pagination, Ch. 7, from Man Cannot Speak for Her. Volume 2: Key Texts of the Early Feminists.   
The Sojourner Truth Project, a website that compares the text of each version of the speech and provides audio reading of both.

Pre-emancipation African-American history
1851 speeches
Women's rights
History of women in the United States
1851 in Ohio
Sojourner Truth
May 1851 events
History of Akron, Ohio